In the Name of the People is a 2017 Chinese TV drama series based on the web novel of the same name by Zhou Meisen. Its plot revolves around a prosecutor's efforts to unearth corruption in a present-day fictional Chinese city. It has drawn large audiences in China, where its release coincides with General Secretary Xi Jinping's leadership's anti-corruption campaign. It is the first broadcast political drama featuring high-level government corruption in China since 2004. The production received significant government funding from the Supreme People's Procuratorate, the highest agency responsible for both investigation and prosecution in the People's Republic of China. The intervention from censors was much lighter due to the support of the authorities. The series is considered by some western observers as the Chinese version of House of Cards.

The program's stars include Lu Yi as detective Hou Liangping, Xu Yajun as his antagonist Qi Tongwei, and Zhang Fengyi as Sha Ruijin, the provincial Party Committee Secretary. The series is based on a book by author Zhou Meisen, and was adapted for television by Zhou and his wife Sun Xinyue. It was primarily filmed in Nanjing, the capital of Jiangsu province.

Synopsis 
In the Name of the People chronicles the internal power struggle of the Chinese Communist Party in the fictional city of Jingzhou, Handong province, featuring stories about Chinese politics that are often talked about but never seen on mainstream television.

Cast 
 Lu Yi as Hou Liangping
 Zhang Fengyi as Sha Ruijin
 Wu Gang as Li Dakang
 Xu Yajun as Qi Tongwei
 Zhang Zhijian as Gao Yuliang
 Ke Lan as Lu Yike
 Bai Zhidi as Chen Yanshi
 Li Guangfu as Zheng Xipo
 Hu Jing as Gao Xiaoqin
 Ding Haifeng as Zhao Donglai
 Zhang Xilin as Cai Chenggong
 Li Jianyi as Ji Changming
 Huang Junpeng as Chen Hai
 Han Benben as Zheng Shengli
 Tang Wan as Lin Huahua
 Yue Xiuqing as Ouyang Jing
 Ji Shuai as Zhou Zheng
 Xu Wenguang as Ding Yizhen
 Xu Guangyu as Cheng Du
 Li Wei as Sun Liancheng
 Zhang Kaili as Wu Huifen
 Li Xinyue as Zhang Baobao
 Huang Pinyuan as Yi Xuexi
 Hao Guang as Qin Siyuan
 Zhao Ziqi as Zhong Xiao'ai
 Hou Yong as Zhao Dehan
 Gao Yalin as Liu Xinjian

Reception 
It is noted for its ensemble cast of skilled veteran actors as well as its high quality despite China's strict censorship system. The drama also surpassed 7% in ratings, breaking the single day ratings record for a Chinese drama. The series also received the praise from People's Daily, which is known as the mouthpiece of the Communist Party.

However, some dissidents, such as cartoonist Rebel Pepper, treated the series as a way for the authorities to manipulate and fool the public. The core of the series is that anti-graft efforts could only be conducted by a strong government rather than democratic elections or a free press, as The New York Times commented. Essentially, the series is not a success of creativity, but a success of the "permits to create", according to a widely spread opinion on Internet by Du Junfei, a professor in mass communication of Nanjing University.

Ratings

Awards and nominations

References

External links 
In the Name of the People at IMDb

2017 Chinese television series debuts
2017 Chinese television series endings
Chinese drama television series
Chinese period television series
Political drama television series
Television shows based on Chinese novels
Television shows set in Beijing
Television shows filmed in Jiangsu
Television shows filmed in Beijing
Mandarin-language television shows
Hunan Television dramas
Television series by EE-Media